Robert W. Dutton is an American electrical engineer. At Stanford University, he is the Robert and Barbara Kleist Professor of Electrical Engineering. Dutton also serves as the undergraduate advisor for Stanford University Department of Electrical Engineering.

Dutton's research interests include the process of integrated circuits fabrication, and circuit and device design and technology.

In 1991, Dutton was elected a member of the National Academy of Engineering for pioneering contributions to the development of computer-aided modeling of semiconductor devices and fabrication processes.

Education 
Dutton attended University of California, Berkeley for his BS (1966), MS (1967), and PhD (1970).

Dutton came to Stanford in 1971.

Career 
Dutton's research combined fabricating requirements with material sensitivities. His team developed software to characterize the various permutations. The software resulting from Dutton's research; SUPREM, (Stanford University Process Engineering Models) and PISCES (Poisson and Continuity Equation Solver), were adopted by industry.

He founded Technology Modeling Associates (TMA), the first Technology CAD company. TMA was bought by Avant! Corp in 1997. TMA's President and CEO was Roy Jewell.

Recognition

 Phil Kaufman Award, Electronic Design Automation Consortium (2006)
 Semiconductor Industry Association (SIA) University Researcher Award (2005) and University Leadership Award (2005)
 IEEE Jack A. Morton Award (1996)
 Member of the National Academy of Engineering 1991
 Guggenheim Fellowship for Natural Sciences (1988)
 IEEE J. J. Ebers Award (1987)

Publications

 More publications.

References

External links
 Stanford profile, Robert Dutton

Year of birth missing (living people)
Living people
UC Berkeley College of Engineering alumni
Stanford University School of Engineering faculty
Members of the United States National Academy of Engineering